Talles Henrique da Cunha Carmo (born 13 March 1989 in Mogi Guaçu), is a Brazilian footballer who plays for Esportivo.

Career
Cunha began his career with Guarani, who was in January 2007 promoted to the first team and joined in April 2008 on loan to Sport Club Internacional. He played a successful first season with Sport Club Internacional and the club pulled the sold option from  Guarani. He played only three matches in 2009 season and his club Sport Club Internacional loaned on 23 February 2010 the forward until December 2010 to Associação Desportiva São Caetano. On 22 February 2011, he moved to Criciúma on loan from Internacional.

International career
He is former member of the Brazil under-20 football team.

References

External links
  
 
 
 
 Talles Cunha at ZeroZero

1989 births
Living people
Footballers from São Paulo (state)
Brazilian footballers
Brazilian expatriate footballers
Brazil under-20 international footballers
Sport Club Internacional players
Association football forwards
Guarani FC players
Associação Desportiva São Caetano players
Criciúma Esporte Clube players
Botafogo Futebol Clube (SP) players
Nova Iguaçu Futebol Clube players
Leixões S.C. players
C.F. União players
SC Sagamihara players
FC Zimbru Chișinău players
Ypiranga Futebol Clube players
Veranópolis Esporte Clube Recreativo e Cultural players
Cuiabá Esporte Clube players
Grêmio Esportivo Glória players
Esporte Clube São Luiz players
Esporte Clube Pelotas players
Associação Desportiva Cabofriense players
Grêmio Esportivo Bagé players
Brasília Futebol Clube players
Clube Esportivo Bento Gonçalves players
Campeonato Brasileiro Série A players
Campeonato Brasileiro Série B players
Campeonato Brasileiro Série C players
J3 League players
Brazilian expatriate sportspeople in Japan
Brazilian expatriate sportspeople in Portugal
Brazilian expatriate sportspeople in Moldova
Expatriate footballers in Japan
Expatriate footballers in Portugal
Expatriate footballers in Moldova
People from Mogi Guaçu